Bangalore Rural Lok Sabha constituency is one of the 28 Lok Sabha (lower house of the Indian parliament) constituencies in the South Indian state of Karnataka. This constituency was created in 2008 following the delimitation of parliamentary constituencies.

It comprises eight assembly segments of which seven are derived from the former Kanakapura Lok Sabha constituency (abolished in 2008). It first held elections in 2009 and its first member of parliament (MP) was H. D. Kumaraswamy of the Janata Dal (Secular) party. Kumaraswamy resigned his seat in 2013. The by election that followed was won by D. K. Suresh of the Indian National Congress (INC). As of the latest election in 2019, Suresh represents this constituency.

History
Kanakapura Lok Sabha constituency was a former Lok Sabha constituency in Karnataka state in southern India. It included eight Assembly constituencies, namely Kanakapura, Ramanagara, Channapatna, Magadi, Sathanur, Uttarahalli, Malavalli and Anekal. Out of them, Kanakapura, Ramanagaram, Channapatna, Magadi and Anekal assembly segments were retained in the Bangalore Rural constituency created in 2008 as part of delimitation in Karnataka. Sathanur was merged between Kanakapura, Ramanagaram and Channapatna constituencies. Malavalli became a part of Mandya constituency and Uttarahalli was reformed and Uttarahalli Circle was merged with new Bangalore South Assembly Constituency.

The new Assembly Constituencies Bangalore South, Anekal, and Rajarajeshwarinagar became a part of Bangalore Rural along with Kunigal Assembly Constituency from Tumkur district

Assembly segments
Bangalore Rural Lok Sabha constituency presently comprises the following eight Legislative Assembly segments:

Members of Parliament

^ by poll

Election results

General election 2019

General election 2014

By election 2013

General election 2009

See also
 Ramanagaram district
 List of Constituencies of the Lok Sabha

References

External links
Bangalore Rural lok sabha  constituency election 2019 date and schedule

Lok Sabha constituencies in Karnataka
Bangalore Rural district